Ronald or Ron Harvey may refer to:

 Ronald Harvey (administrator) (born 1934), Australian public servant and sport administrator
 Ronald Harvey (cricketer) (born 1934), English cricketer
 Ron Harvey (Australian rules footballer) (1935–1991), Australian rules footballer
 Ron Harvey (rugby union) (born 1933), Australian rugby union player